Begonia sutherlandii, known as the Sutherland begonia and as iwozya in Kimalila, Tanzania, is a tuberous flowering perennial plant in the family Begoniaceae, growing to  with fleshy pink stems from  long. Leaves are commonly dark green and veined with red and covered with short hairs on the underside. They are asymmetrical in shape and the margin is toothed.

The plant is native to the southern highlands of Tanzania and is often found hanging over rocks in damp shady situations or on trees. It is also present in the Democratic Republic of the Congo and in South Africa.

Begonia sutherlandii can be cultivated outdoors in frost-free areas. It has gained the Royal Horticultural Society's Award of Garden Merit.

References

Jex-Blake, A. J. (1957) Gardening in East Africa. Longmans
Watt, J. M. & Breyer - Brandwijk, M. G. (1962) The Medicinal and Poisonous Plants of Southern and Eastern Africa. Livingstone
Cribb, P. J. & Leedal, G. P. (1982) The Mountain Flowers of Southern Tanzania. A. A. Balkema, Rotterdam
Neuwinger H. D. (2000) African Traditional Medicine. Medpharm GmBH Scientific Publishers, Stuttgart, Germany
Lemmens, R. H. M. J. (2004) Begonia macrocarpa Warb. In Grubben, G. J. H. & Denton, O. A. (Editors). Plant Resources of Tropical Africa 2. Vegetables. PROTA Foundation, Wageningen, Netherlands/Backhuys Publishers, Leiden, Netherlands / CTA. p. 106
Burrows, J & Willis, C. (2005) Plants of the Nyika plateau. Sabonet report no. 31
Latham, P. (2008) Plants visited by bees and other useful plants of Umalila, Southern Tanzania

sutherlandii
Flora of Africa
Edible plants
Plants used in traditional African medicine
Zulu culture
Taxa named by Joseph Dalton Hooker